Colonial elections were held in South Australia on 9 March 1857. All 36 seats in the South Australian House of Assembly, and all 18 seats in the Legislative Council were up for election.

At the time of the election, Boyle Travers Finniss led a government which had been formed to administer the election, and to establish the first responsible government.

Pre-party Premiers

No parties or solid groupings would be formed until after the 1890 election, which resulted in frequent changes of the Premier of South Australia. If for any reason the incumbent Premier lost sufficient support through a successful motion of no confidence at any time on the floor of the house, he would tender his resignation to the Governor of South Australia, which would result in another member deemed to have the support of the House of Assembly being sworn in by the Governor as the next Premier.

Informal groupings began and increased government stability occurred from the 1887 election. The United Labor Party would be formed in 1891, while the National Defence League would be formed later in the same year.

The first six Governors of South Australia oversaw governance from proclamation in 1836 until self-government and an elected bicameral Parliament of South Australia was enacted in the year prior to the inaugural 1857 election. The pre-1857 unicameral Legislative Council was partially represented from earlier 1851 and 1855 elections.

See also
Members of the South Australian House of Assembly, 1857–1860
Members of the South Australian Legislative Council, 1857–1861

References
History of South Australian elections 1857-2006, volume 1: ECSA
Statistical Record of the Legislature 1836-2007: SA Parliament

Elections in South Australia
1857 elections in Australia
1850s in South Australia
March 1857 events